A žaltys (literally: grass snake) is a household spirit in Lithuanian mythology. As sacred animal of the sun goddess Saulė, it is a guardian of the home and a symbol of fertility. People used to keep it as a pet by the stove or other special area of the house, believing that it would bring good harvest and wealth. Killing žaltys was said to bring great misfortunes upon the household. If žaltys was found in the field, people gave it milk attempting to befriend the creature and make it a sacred household pet.

See also
 Eglė the Queen of Serpents
 Proto-Indo-European mythology
 Indo-European cosmogony
 Baltic mythology
 Prussian mythology

References

Fertility gods
Lithuanian gods
Lithuanian folklore characters
Legendary serpents
Baltic legendary creatures
Baltic gods
Snake gods